Linda Waterfall (1949 – January 8, 2019) was an American folk musician and singer-songwriter. She was active for 38 years, from 1977 to 2015, when she released her 14th album, Hometown Girl (Franklin Point Music).

Career
Waterfall grew up in northern Illinois and began studying piano at the age of eight. Her parents (both musicians) discouraged her from a musical career. She graduated from Stanford University in 1971 with a degree in visual art.

Despite her parents' advice, she began a career in music. She moved to Seattle, Washington, in 1975 and toured nationally since 1983.
 She taught composition and song-writing at Cornish College of the Arts in Seattle from 2004 to 2012.

In the 1960s, she spent several years as a student of Baba Hari Dass and also studied Transcendental Meditation. She was a breast cancer survivor. She died in Seattle after a long illness.

Discography
 Mary's Garden (1977, Windham Hill)
 My Heart Sings (1979, Trout)
 Bananaland (1981, Trout)
 Everything Looks Different with Scott Nygaard (1983, Trout) 
 Body English (1987, Flying Fish)
 A Little Bit at a Time (1991, Flying Fish)
 Flying Time (1994, Trout)
 In the Presence of the Light (1998, Trout/Liquid City)
 That Art Thou: Songs from the Vedas (2002, Trout)
 Place of Refuge (2006, Trout)
 Songs From the Dao de Jing (2007, Trout)
 Welcome to the Dark (2009)
 Hometown Girl (2015, Franklin Point)

Other Appearances
 Entropy Service (1974) with Peter Langston, J.B. White, Judith Cook
 A Musical Doorway (2000, Various Artists) Produced by Seattle Folklore Society

References

External links
 Official site

1950 births
American folk singers
Living people
People from Illinois
Musicians from Seattle
Stanford University alumni
Singer-songwriters from Washington (state)
Cornish College of the Arts faculty
Windham Hill Records artists
Flying Fish Records artists